Gottfried Reiche (5 February 1667  6 October 1734) was a German trumpet player and composer of the Baroque era. Reiche is best known for having been Johann Sebastian Bach's chief trumpeter at Leipzig from Bach's arrival there in 1723 until Reiche's death.

Biography
Reiche was steeped in trumpet playing from an early age – he was born in the town of Weissenfels, Germany which had a long tradition of trumpet music at its court.  He went to Leipzig in 1688, eventually succeeding trumpeter Johann C. Genzmer there as Senior Stadtmusicus in 1719.

Reiche was a musician of great skill, if one can judge from the trumpet parts written for him by Bach.  They are among the most florid, creative, and difficult trumpet parts of the Baroque era, quite clearly intended for a player of great virtuosity.

He is the subject of a famous painting of the era, which was made by Leipzig artist E.G. Haussmann for the occasion of Reiche's 60th birthday in 1727.  In the portrait, Reiche holds a coiled natural trumpet (Ger. Jägertrompete, trans. hunting trumpet) in his right hand.  In his left hand, he holds a sheet of manuscript music on which is written a short Abblasen or fanfare.  The musical notes are depicted accurately in the painting, and the fanfare has been transcribed and performed by several artists.  It has also served for many years as the theme music to the American television show CBS Sunday Morning.

While Reiche himself composed many such Abblasen and other "tower music" (Turmmusik) (most of which is lost), some scholars believe that the style of the music in the portrait hints at possibly being composed by J.S. Bach himself, perhaps as a birthday gift for his chief trumpeter.

Reiche died of a stroke in Leipzig, Germany, collapsing in the street while walking home one night.  A contemporary account attributed the stroke to the strain of having played trumpet the previous evening, with "his condition having been greatly aggravated from the smoke given off by the torch-lights", when he participated in the performance of Bach's congratulatory cantata Preise dein Glücke, gesegnetes Sachsen, BWV 215.

After his death, Reiche was succeeded by Christoph Ruhe.

Literature
 Don Smithers, Gottfried Reiches Ansehen und sein Einfluß auf die Musik Johann Sebastian Bachs, Bach-Jahrbuch 73, p. 113-150, 1987
 Don Smithers, Bach, Reiche and the Leipzig Collegia Musica, Historic Brass Society Journal 2, p. 1-51, 1990
 The Ewald Brass Quintet's recording of the complete Vierundzwanzig neue Quatricinien (1696): Hungaroton HCD 32451

References

External links

Musical score and sound files of the "Abblasen"
Did Bach actually compose the famous "Abblasen?"

1667 births
1734 deaths
People from Weißenfels
German classical trumpeters
Male trumpeters
German Baroque composers
German multi-instrumentalists
18th-century classical composers
German male classical composers
18th-century German composers
18th-century German male musicians